Enteromius atromaculatus is a species of ray-finned fish in the genus Barbus.

Footnotes 

 

Enteromius
Taxa named by John Treadwell Nichols
Taxa named by Ludlow Griscom
Fish described in 1917